Third Wire Productions Inc. is a C corporation based in Austin, Texas, United States; it is an independent software development company founded in 1999 to create multimedia entertainment, such as amateur flight simulators and strategy video games.

Products 
Third Wire is the developer of many computer games, including First Eagles: The Great War 1918 and Strike Fighters: Project 1. There are other products outside of the combat sim genre, a notable example of these projects is First Flight: The Wright Experience Flight Simulator, which is a Wright brothers' Flyer simulator for reenactors.

Strike Fighters: Project 1 (2002)
First Flight: The Wright Experience Flight Simulator (2003): A training tool developed for Wright Experience Centennial test pilots and now available for the public.
Strike Fighters: Gold (2004)
Wings Over Vietnam (2004)
USAF: Air Dominance (2005): A recruitment game developed for the US Air Force (not for public sale).
Wings Over Europe (2006)
First Eagles: The Great War 1918 (2006)
First Eagles: Expansion Pack 1 (2007)
Wings Over Israel (2008)
First Eagles: Gold (2008): A combo pack containing First Eagles and Expansion Pack 1.
Strike Fighters 2 (2008): An update to Strike Fighters: Project 1 to run on Windows Vista.
Strike Fighters 2 Vietnam (2009): An update to Wings Over Vietnam to run on Windows Vista.
Strike Fighters 2 Europe (2009): An update to Wings Over Europe to run on Windows Vista.
Strike Fighters 2 Israel (2009): An update to Wings Over Israel to run on Windows Vista with Direct X 10 support.
First Eagles 2 (2010): An update to First Eagles: Gold to run on Windows Vista and Windows 7.
Strike Fighters 2 Expansion Pack 1 (2010): First of the expansion packs for Strike Fighters 2 series, requires Strike Fighters 2 Israel stand-alone or merged with other Strike Fighters 2 series to run, adds Operation Kadesh, and 3 new flyable planes: Mystère IVA, Meteor F.8, and P-51D Mustang.
Wings Over Israel Add-on (2010): an add-on to the Wings Over Israel, it adds Mystère IVA, Meteor F.8, and P-51D Mustang as player-flyable aircraft.
Strike Fighters 2 Expansion Pack 2 (2010): Second of the expansion packs for Strike Fighters 2 series, requires Strike Fighters 2 Europe stand-alone or merged with other Strike Fighters 2 series to run, adds a hypothetical 1956 campaign, and 3 new flyable planes, as well as several variants: English Electric Lightning F.1/2/3/6, Hawker Hunter F.1/2/4/5, F-100A/C.
Strike Fighters 2 North Atlantic (2012): New title in the Strike Fighter series to include new terrain engine, better graphics and F-14A Tomcat as player flyable.
Strike Fighters 2 Expansion Pack 3 (TBD): Third expansion pack will add the Mirage F1 as a player flyable aircraft.

See also 
Jane's AH-64D Longbow
Jane's Longbow 2
European Air War

References

External links 
Third Wire website
USAF: Air Dominance
CombatACE: Online Community and download site

American companies established in 1999
Companies based in Austin, Texas
Video game companies of the United States
Video game development companies